Yemmerrawanne ( - 18 May 1794) was a member of the Wangal people, part of the Eora nation in the Port Jackson area at the time of the first British settlement in Australia, in 1788. Along with another Aboriginal man, Bennelong, he accompanied Governor Arthur Phillip when the latter returned to England in 179293. Yemmerrawanne did not return to Australia; he fell ill, died and was buried in England.

In Australia

Yemmerrawanne was well-known to the British settlers; he was described by Captain Watkin Tench as a "good-tempered lively lad" who became "a great favourite with us, and almost constantly lived at the governor's house". Clothes were made for him, and he learnt to wait on the table.

In February 1791, aged about 16, Yemmerrawanne was initiated, as was the Aboriginal custom, by having a front tooth knocked out.

Journey to England

In December 1792, Arthur Phillip left the colony on the convict transport ship Atlantic to return to England. Yemmerrawanne and Bennelong went with Phillip "voluntarily and cheerfully", knowing that their destination was "at a great distance". Atlantic called at Rio de Janeiro, where their presence was noted: They arrived at Falmouth, Cornwall in May 1793.

In England

After arriving in London, Yemmerrawanne and Bennelong were provided with fashionable clothing, suitable for wearing in English society. They stayed in Mayfair at the home of William Waterhouse, father of Henry Waterhouse, and visited a variety of shows and other entertainments in London. Tutors were hired to educate them in reading, writing and the English language.

While in Mayfair, Yemmerrawanne and Bennelong gave a recital of a native song accompanied by clapsticks. One of their audience, Edward Jones wrote down and published the words and music (in Musical Curiosities, London, 1811), the oldest known published music from Australia.

Illness and death

In September 1793, Yemmerrawanne was ill and reportedly appeared "much emaciated". The following month he injured his leg, and his health continued to deteriorate. Both Aboriginal men were moved to Eltham, where Yemmerrawanne was treated by the physician Gilbert Blane. His illness persisted, despite a variety of treatments, and Yemmerrawanne died on 18 May 1794, aged about 19, from a lung infection. He was buried in the local churchyard.

There have been several campaigns, including plans by Burnum Burnum and Geoffrey Robertson, to return Yemmerrawanne's remains to Australia, but the current location of his remains is unknown. The gravestone's location is known, but it has been moved several times since his burial.

Name variations

As is common with Aboriginal words, Yemmerrawanne's name has been recorded with several different spellings.
 Imeerawanyee, in Tench's A Complete Account of the Settlement at Port Jackson
 Yem-mer-ra-wan-nie, in David Collins' An Account of the English Colony of NSW
 Imerewanga, by Elizabeth Macarthur
 Yemmerawanya, in Phillip's letters
 Yemmurravonyea Kebarrah, in the Eltham parish register entry of his death. Kebarrah is an honorific indicating that he had been initiated by having his tooth knocked out.
 Yemmerrawanyea, on his gravestone

References

1775 births
1794 deaths
Eora people
History of Australia (1788–1850)